"Angel Fingers (A Teen Ballad)" is a popular song by Wizzard.

Written and produced by Roy Wood, it was Wizzard's second, and last, UK number one single, spending a week at the top of the UK Singles Chart in September 1973. It peaked at number seven in Ireland.

Backing vocals were provided by the Bleach Boys and the Suedettes.

Charts

Certifications

References

Song recordings produced by Roy Wood
UK Singles Chart number-one singles
1973 songs
Wizzard songs
Songs written by Roy Wood
Song recordings with Wall of Sound arrangements
Harvest Records singles